Jumbunna was a railway station on the Outtrim line in South Gippsland, Victoria, Australia. The station was opened in 1894, and was one of only three stations on the Outtrim line which was eventually closed in two stages between 1951 and 1953, when Victorian Railways was closing many other small branch lines.

The original station, now converted into a 3 bedroom house, and miniature railway was put up for sale in late 2006.

See also
Jumbunna, Victoria

References

Disused railway stations in Victoria (Australia)
Transport in Gippsland (region)
Shire of South Gippsland